Te tengo en salsa is a Venezuelan telenovela created by Ana Teresa Sosa and Neida Padilla that premiered on RCTV on November 22, 2006, and ended on May 1, 2007. It stars Estefanía López, Luciano D'Alessandro, Mirela Mendoza, and Eduardo Orozco.

Cast

Starring 
 Estefanía López as Adriana Palacios
 Luciano D'Alessandro as Carlos Raúl Perroni Montiel
 Eduardo Orozco as César Román Perroni Montiel
 Mirela Mendoza as Ninoska Valladares

Also starring 
 Hilda Abrahamz as Gioconda Chaparro
 Gigi Zancheta as Matilde Guillén De Palacios
 Kiara as Azalea Montiel De Perroni
 Roberto Moll as Salvatore Perroni
 Iván Tamayo as Humberto Sánchez
 Julio Pereira as Emiliano Palacios
 Gustavo Rodríguez as Emerson Chaparro
 Wanda D'Isidoro as Beatrice Perroni
 Juliet Lima as Patricia Palacios 
 Alejandro Otero as Ignacio Fustinioni
 Emerson Rondón as Mauricio Arcaya
 Yoletty Cabrera as Francesca León
 Reinaldo Zavarce as Diego Sánchez
 Cristina Dacosta as Victoria Palacios
 Jeanette Flores as Clarisa López
 Claudia Moreno as Raiza Castañeda
 Sebastián Díaz as Mélgikson Chaparro
 Michelle Taurel as Alicia Rivero
 Jéssica Rodríguez as Vanessa Regalado
 Vanessa Flores as Sonalí Castillo
 Omaira Abinade as Leticia Pérez

Special participation 
 Natasha Moll as Yuritzi Del Carmen Chaparro 
 Luis Alfredo Olavarrieta as Yonlenon Chaparro
 Juan Carlos Lobo as Joel Morales
 Alicia Hernández as Desireé Salcedo

Guest stars 
 Gabriel Fernández as Luciano Guillén
 Martha Olivo as Mamá Juana

References

External links 
 

2006 telenovelas
Spanish-language telenovelas
Venezuelan telenovelas
RCTV telenovelas
2006 Venezuelan television series debuts
2007 Venezuelan television series endings
Television shows set in Caracas